Menchov is a surname. Notable people with the surname include:

Denis Menchov (born 1978), Russian cyclist
Dmitrii Menshov (1892–1988), Russian mathematician